USS LST-70 was an  in the United States Navy. Like many of her class, she was not named and is properly referred to by her hull designation. LST-70 was manned by a United States Coast Guard crew throughout the Second World War.

LST-70 was laid down on 13 November 1942 at Jeffersonville, Indiana, by the Jeffersonville Boat & Machine Co.; launched on 8 February 1943; sponsored by Mrs. George R. Bickel; and commissioned on 28 May 1943.

Service history
During World War II LST-70 was assigned to the Asiatic-Pacific theater and participated in the occupation and defense of Cape Torokina in November 1943, the Green Islands landing in February 1944, the capture and occupation of Guam in July 1944.

LST-70 participated in the assault and occupation of Iwo Jima in February 1945. In the documentary film To the Shores of Iwo Jima, one of the LCVPs belonging to LST-70 can be seen going ashore at the Battle of Iwo Jima. The boat has PRESS painted on the  side of it, and was presumably bringing photographers and reporters ashore.

LST-70 also participated in the assault and occupation of Okinawa Gunto in April and May 1945.

Following the war, LST-70 performed occupation duty in the Far East in October and November 1945. She returned to the United States and was decommissioned on 1 April 1946, and struck from the Naval Register on 1 May 1946. She was sold for scrapping on 1 July 1946 to Arctic Circle Exploration, Inc., of Seattle, Washington.

LST-70 earned five battle stars for World War II service.

References

See also
 List of United States Navy LSTs

World War II amphibious warfare vessels of the United States
Ships built in Jeffersonville, Indiana
1943 ships
LST-1-class tank landing ships of the United States Navy